SS (RMS) Snaefell (II) No. 67289 – the second vessel in the line's history to be so named – was an iron paddle steamer which was owned and operated by the Isle of Man Steam Packet Company.

Construction & dimensions
Snaefell was built at the yards of Cairn & Co., Glasgow, in 1876. 
Her builders also supplied her engines and boilers and she was launched on Thursday 27 April 1876.

In 1885, Snaefell received new boilers at a cost of £8,512 (equivalent to £ in ). 
They were produced by Fawcett, Preston & Company of Liverpool and installed by Jones & Sons Ltd.

In 1895, she was fitted with electric lighting. The cost of the installation was £425 (equivalent to £ in ).

Service life
A smaller vessel then her immediate predecessors, but judged successful none-the-less, Snaefell served the many ports to which the Company then operated.

On 13 September 1876, Snaefell collided with the barque Lily of Devon, which was anchored in the River Mersey. The barqe sustained moderate damage, Snaefell only had one of her boats damaged. In April 1881, she was involved in a collision with the Osprey off Douglas Head. In December 1888, Snaefell collided with the steamship Maranhense and was severely damaged. She was taken in to Liverpool.

In August 1892, she was making passage to Ardrossan from Douglas in hazy weather, when she collided with the Norwegian vessel Kaleb. Both ships were damaged, but the Snaefell was able to continue to the yards of Fairfield & Co. under her own steam for repairs. The subsequent repairs cost £1,298 (equivalent to £ in ). 
A legal wrangle then ensued, and finally the High Court in Edinburgh held that both ships were to blame.

The Royal Netherlands Steamship Company, who had bought Snaefell (I) and had successfully operated her for 13 years, sometimes chartered Snaefell (II).

Disposal
Snaefell was scrapped in 1905.

References

Bibliography

 Chappell, Connery (1980). Island Lifeline T.Stephenson & Sons Ltd 

Passenger ships of the United Kingdom
Ships of the Isle of Man Steam Packet Company
Steamships
1876 ships
Paddle steamers of the United Kingdom
Ferries of the Isle of Man
Steamships of the United Kingdom
Merchant ships of the United Kingdom
Maritime incidents in September 1876
Maritime incidents in April 1881
Maritime incidents in December 1888
Maritime incidents in 1892
Ships built on the River Clyde